Goswin Karl Uphues (13 March 1841 – 10 September 1916) was a German philosopher. He taught at a gymnasium in Aarau before becoming a professor at the University of Halle.

A collection of papers published by Uphues between 1869 and 1882 was edited by Kurt Flasch in 1973.

Works
 Die definition des satzes: nach den Platonischen dialogen Kratylus, Theaetet. Sophistes, 1882.
 Grundlehren der logik. Nach Richard Shute's Discourse on truth, 1883.
 Wahrnehmung und Empfindung. Untersuchungen zur empirischen Psychologie, 1888.
 Über die Erinnerung: Untersuchungen zur empirischen Psychologie, 1889.
 Psychologie des Erkennens vom empirischen Standpunkte, 1893.
 Sokrates und Pestalozzi: zwei Vorträge bei Gelegenheit der Pestalozzifeier, 1896.
 Einführung in die moderne Logik, 1901.
 Zur Krisis in der Logik. Eine Auseinandersetzung mit Dr. Melchior Palágyi, 1903.
 Kant und seine Vorgänger. Was wir von ihnen lernen können, 1906.
 Erkenntniskritische Psychologie; Leitfaden für Vorlesungen, 1909.
 Geschichte der Philosophie als Erkenntniskritik: Leitfaden für Vorlesungen, 1909.
 Die sinnenwelt und ideenwelt, 1914.
 Sprachtheorie und Metaphysik bei Platon, Aristoteles und in der Scholastik, 1972. Edited by Kurt Flasch

References

External links
 
 

1841 births
1916 deaths
19th-century philosophers
20th-century German  philosophers
German logicians
Metaphysicians
19th-century German writers
19th-century German male writers